Miss America's Outstanding Teen 2009 was the 4th Miss America's Outstanding Teen pageant held at the Linda Chapin Theater in the Orange County Convention Center in Orlando, Florida on August 16, 2008. At the conclusion of the event, Caitlin Brunell of Virginia crowned her successor Taylor Hanna Fitch of South Carolina. The pageant was hosted by Miss America 2008 Kirsten Haglund and performer Billy Flanigan.

Results

Placements

Other Awards

Order of Announcement

Top 10 

 California
 Pennsylvania
 Arkansas
 Missouri
 South Carolina
 District of Columbia
 Texas
 Oklahoma
 Maryland
 Virginia

Top 5 

 Pennsylvania
 Arkansas
 Missouri
 South Carolina
 Maryland

Pageant

Selection of Contestants 
One delegate from each state, District of Columbia, and the Virgin Islands were chosen in state pageants between September 2007- July 2008

Preliminaries 
During the 3 days prior to the final night, the delegates compete in the preliminary competition, which include a private interview with the judges and a show where they compete in lifestyle and fitness in athletic wear, evening wear, talent, and on-stage question. They were held on August 13–15, 2008.

Finals 
During the finals, the top 10 compete in lifestyle and fitness in athletic wear, talent, and evening wear, and the top 5 compete in on-stage question.

Contestants 
52 delegates participated:

References

2009
2009 in Florida
2009 beauty pageants